One Man Army is an American punk rock band that was formed in San Francisco, California, United States, in 1996 and separated in 2005 and reunited in 2011. The band was discovered by Billie Joe Armstrong while playing in an East Bay club, and their debut album Dead End Stories was the first release on Adeline Records, Armstrong's label.

History
Originally consisting of Jack Dalrymple (guitar, lead vocals), Brandon Pollack (drums), and James Kotter (bass), the members at the time of separation were Dalrymple, Heiko Schrepel (bass, backup vocals) and Chip Hanna (drums).

Dalrymple still plays guitar for the Swingin' Utters. Jack was also guitarist and singer for Dead to Me, formed with Brandon Pollack. On July 31, 2009, Dead to Me announced that Jack was no longer recording or touring with the band, in order to devote time to his newborn baby, Jack Dalrymple III. Dalrymple also started another band with fellow Swingin' Utters members Spike Slawson and Darius Koski, called the Re-Volts.

In 2011 it was announced on the Adeline Records website that One Man Army had reunited, and that Adeline Records planned to re-release One Man Army's first two albums.  The reunited line-up is Jack Dalrymple, Heiko Schrepel, and Brandon Pollack.  A four-song EP entitled "She's an Alarm" (produced by Jamie McMann) was released in Aug 2012 on green and pink neon 7" vinyl. "She's An Alarm" and their first 2 albums were also released digitally at this time.

On April 6, 2015, bassist Heiko Schrepel died.

Discography
Albums:
 Dead End Stories (1998, Adeline Records)
 Last Word Spoken (2000, Adeline Records)
 Rumors and Headlines (2002, BYO Records)

EPs:
 Shooting Blanks EP
 Bootlegger's Son EP, TKO Records
 Fat Club 7", Fat Wreck Chords (2001)
 BYO Split Series, Vol. 5 (split with Alkaline Trio), BYO Records (2004)
 She's An Alarm, Adeline Records (2012)

DVD:
 One Man Army: The Show Must Go Off (2003 on Kung Fu Records)

References

External links
[ Profile] at Allmusic
Profile at BYO Records
Profile at Interpunk

Punk rock groups from California
Musical groups from San Francisco
Street punk groups
Musical groups established in 1996
Musical groups disestablished in 2005
Musical groups reestablished in 2011
Adeline Records artists
BYO Records artists